Cencio Frangipane may refer to:
Cencio I Frangipane
Cencio II Frangipane